Delos Packard Thurber (November 23, 1916 in Los Angeles, California – May 12, 1987 in San Diego, California) was an American athlete who competed mainly in the high jump. He graduated from the University of Southern California.

He competed for the United States in the 1936 Summer Olympics held in Berlin, Germany in the high jump where he won the bronze medal.

During World War II Thurber was a pilot, serving in the Pacific Theater of Operations.  After the war he stayed on in the Philippines as one of the founders of what would become Philippine Airlines.  He eventually settled in San Diego and continued to fly DC-3 part-time for a non-sked operation until his 60th birthday forced his retirement from that.

External links 
 

1916 births
1987 deaths
American male high jumpers
Athletes (track and field) at the 1936 Summer Olympics
Olympic bronze medalists for the United States in track and field
Track and field athletes from Los Angeles
Medalists at the 1936 Summer Olympics
University of Southern California alumni